William Julius Moore (February 4, 1912 – May 25, 1973) was an American football player. 

A native of Wheeling, West Virginia, Moore attended The Kiski School and then played college football at the University of North Carolina.

He then played professional football in the National Football League (NFL) as an end for the Detroit Lions. He appeared in nine games for the Lions during the 1939 season and caught six passes for 82 yards and a touchdown.

References

1912 births
1973 deaths
American football ends
Detroit Lions players
North Carolina Tar Heels football players
Sportspeople from Wheeling, West Virginia
Players of American football from West Virginia